The Sequence Ontology (SO) is an ontology suitable for describing biological sequences.  It is designed to make the naming of DNA sequence features and variants consistent and therefore machine-readable and searchable.

References

External links 
 

Ontology (information science)
Biological databases